The 2018–19 Mississippi State Bulldogs basketball team represented Mississippi State University in the 2018–19 NCAA Division I men's basketball season. The Bulldogs, led by fourth-year head coach Ben Howland, played their home games at the Humphrey Coliseum in Starkville, Mississippi as members of the Southeastern Conference. They finished the season 23-11, to finish a tie for 6th place. In the SEC Tournament, They defeated Texas A&M in the second round before losing to Tennessee in the quarterfinals. They received a at-large bid to the NCAA Tournament where they were upset by 12th seed Liberty in the first round.

Previous season
The Bulldogs finished the 2017–18 season 25–12, 9–9 in SEC play to finish in a tie for seventh place. They defeated LSU in the second round of the SEC tournament before losing in the quarterfinals to Tennessee. They were received an at-large bid to the National Invitation Tournament where they defeated Nebraska, Baylor, and Louisville to advance to the semifinals where they lost to Penn State.

Offseason

Departures

Incoming transfers

2018 recruiting class

Roster

Schedule and results

|-
!colspan=12 style=|Exhibition

|-
!colspan=12 style=|Non-conference regular season

|-
!colspan=12 style=| SEC regular season

|-
!colspan=12 style=| SEC tournament

|-
!colspan=12 style=| NCAA tournament

Rankings

*AP does not release post-NCAA Tournament rankings^Coaches did not release a Week 2 poll.

References

Mississippi State Bulldogs men's basketball seasons
Mississippi State
Mississippi State Bulldogs men's
Mississippi State Bulldogs men's
Mississippi State